Phoneme Media is a Los Angeles-based nonprofit publishing house sponsored by PEN Center USA. Phoneme was founded in 2013 by translators Brian Hewes and David Shook. The aim of the company was to increase the availability of books and videos from countries and languages underrepresented in English translation. In 2019, Phoneme was acquired by Deep Vellum Publishing.

Notable authors 
 David Avidan
 Mario Bellatin
 Mohsen Emadi
 Natalia Toledo
 Roberto Castillo Udiarte
 Rocío Cerón

Source languages 
 Icelandic
 Lingala
 Spanish
 Tsotsil
 Yucatec Maya
 Zapotec
 Zoque
 Hebrew

References

External links 
 Phoneme Media in the American Literary Translators Association Publishers Database

2013 establishments in California
Mass media companies of the United States